Megha Majumdar (born 1987/1988) is an Indian novelist who lives in New York City. Her debut novel, A Burning, was a New York Times best seller, and in 2022 won a Whiting Award.

Early life
Majumdar was born in Kolkata, India. In 2006, she moved to the United States to study social anthropology at Harvard University. She went on to complete her graduate studies at Johns Hopkins University, earning a master's degree in anthropology.

Career
Majumdar's debut novel, A Burning, was released in 2020 and became a New York Times best seller. Ron Charles of The Washington Post wrote Majumdar "demonstrates an uncanny ability to capture the vast scope of a tumultuous society by attending to the hopes and fears of people living on the margins. The effect is transporting, often thrilling, finally harrowing. It’s no wonder this propulsive novel was chosen for the Today Show book club and leaped immediately onto the bestseller list." In TIME, Naina Bajekal described the novel as "a powerful corrective to the political narratives that have dominated in contemporary India." In 2020, Majumdar told The Wall Street Journal, "I hope the questions [I ask in the book] don’t appear contained in India and...that readers here are able to think of contemporary America too." Majumdar's writing style has been compared to that of Jhumpa Lahiri and Yaa Gyasi. 

At the time of her novel's publication, Majumdar worked as an editor at Catapult Books in New York City. In 2021, Majumdar was promoted to Editor-in-Chief of Catapult, and her authors included Matthew Salesses, Randa Jarrar, Ruby Hamad, Sindya Bhanoo and Ye Chun. In May 2022, she left the position to focus on her writing and teaching.

Honors and awards
A Burning was shortlisted for the 2021 Andrew Carnegie Medal for Fiction, and in April 2022 Majumdar won a Whiting Award.

Bibliography 
 A Burning,  New York : Alfred A. Knopf, 2020.

References

External links
Megha Majumdar at Penguin India

Living people
21st-century Indian women writers
21st-century Indian writers
Indian emigrants to the United States
Writers from Kolkata
Writers from New York City
Harvard University alumni
Johns Hopkins University alumni
Year of birth missing (living people)